Belenus (Gaulish: Belenos, Belinos) is an ancient Celtic healing god. The cult of Belenus stretched from the Italian Peninsula to the British Isles, with a main sanctuary located at Aquileia, on the Adriatic coast. Through interpretatio romana, Belenus was often identified with Apollo, although his cult seems to have preserved a certain degree of autonomy during the Roman period.

Name

Attestations 
The theonym Belenus (or Belinus), which is a latinized form of the Gaulish Belenos (or Belinos), appears in some 51 inscriptions. Although most of them are located in Aquileia (near modern Trieste, Italy), the main centre of his cult, the name has also been found in places where Celtic speakers lived in ancient times, including in Gaul, Noricum, Illyria, and the British Islands.  

Linguist Blanca María Prósper argues that Belinos was probably the original form, which also appears in the name  (from an earlier Belinos), a Welsh leader who died in 627 AD. Known variants include Bellinus and perhaps Belus. The deity may also have been known in Ireland and Britain by the variants Bel, Beli, and Bile.

Etymology

The etymology of Belenos remains unclear. It has been traditionally translated as the 'bright one' or the 'shining one', by deriving the name from a Proto-Indo-European root *bʰelH-, interpreted as 'white, shining' (cf. Lith. báltas 'white', Grk φαλός phalós 'white', Arm. bal 'pallor', Goth. bala 'grey'). This theory was encouraged by the interpretatio romana of Belenos as the 'Gaulish Apollo', a divinity with sun attributes.

However, this etymology has come under increasing criticism in recent scholarship. Xavier Delamarre notes that the proposed cognates stemming from *bʰelH- do not seem to connote 'shining', but rather '[pale] white' or 'grey', and suggests that Belenos may rather derive from the Gaulish stem belo- ('strong, powerful') attached to the suffix -nos ('lord, master'), which would lead to Belenos as the 'Master of Power'. Alternatively, Peter Schrijver has proposed that Belenos might be an o-stem of the Indo-European root *bʰel-, designating the henbane (cf. Welsh bela, Germanic *bel(u)nōn, Slavic *bъlnъ), a psychoactive plant which was known as belenuntia in Gaulish and as apollinaris in Latin. Bernhard Maier and Patrizia de Bernardo Stempel have also argued that the name may derive from a root *gwelH-, meaning 'source, spring'. According to Šašel Kos, Belenus' "close association with water is confirmed by two dedications to Fons B(eleni) and by an altar in which Belenus is worshipped together with the Nymphs. Thermal springs are also attested to at Iulium Carnicum." The 19th-century attempt to link the root bel- with the Phoenician deity Baal is now widely rejected by modern scholars.

Related terms 
A village that is now part of the municipality of Aquileia is still named Beligna. A tribal leader of pre-Roman Britain was named Cunobelinos (Old Welsh Conbelin), which possibly means 'hound of Belenos', or else 'strong as a dog' if the name is not theophoric. The Old Welsh personal name Liuelin (modern Llywelyn) goes back to a similar compound *lugu-belinos (either a dvandva with the names of two deities, or else 'strong as Lugus'). The Brittonic variant of the name could be the source of the Billingsgate ward in London, although this may be a folk etymology, and possibly of the fountain of Belenton (now Bérenton) in the Brocéliande forest in Brittany. The names of the Welsh and Irish ancestor-figures Beli Mawr and Bile may also be related.

The Gaulish term belenuntia (Βελενούντιαν), designating the henbane, a hallucinogenic plant also known in Latin as apollinaris, may be a derivative form of Belenos. The variant belenion, cited as a poisonous plant by Pseudo-Aristotle, appears to be the source of the Spanish beleño ('henbane'). The Gallo-Roman term belisa could also have been borrowed into Old High German as bilisa (cf. modern German Bilsenkraut 'henbane'). Henbane was commonly used in antiquity for medicinal purposes, providing further evidence of Belanos' healing attributes. A shallow stone dish found in Saint-Chamas (south of France) and dedicated to Beleino could thus have been used to hold hallucinogenic substances.

According to Delamarre, the name of the goddess Belisama appears to be built on a same stem bel(o)- ('strong, powerful') attached to the intensifying suffix -isama, and could thus been translated as 'Very Powerful'. Schrijver rather links it to a stem for 'henbane', *beles-, attached to an unknown suffix -ma, and compares the name with the Gaulish theonym Belisa-maros. The personal name Bellovesus can probably be translated as 'Worthy of Power', from bello- ('power') attached to uesus ('worthy, good, deserving').

Spanish scholarship also relates the deity's name to Aquitanian anthroponym Belinatepos or Belanetepos (taken to have an equine association), as well as the toponyms Beleño and Beloño.

Epithets
In ancient Gaul and Britain, Apollo was commonly associated with the sun and healing attributes. He may have been equated with fifteen or more different names and epithets (including Belenus, Vindonnus, Grannos, Borvo, Maponus, Moritasgus, among others).

The god was venerated as Apollo Belenus at the curative shrine of Sainte-Sabine (Burgundy), where he was invoked by pilgrims seeking cures for their sickness. If Belenus is interpreted as meaning 'shining, brilliant', it can be compared to the Celtic epithet Vindonnus (from *windo- 'white'), attached to Apollo as a deity who restored light and vision to people with eye disease at Essarois (Burgundy).

Historical cult

Origin 
According to philologist Helmut Birkhan, Belenus was seen as a "typical Karnian oracle- and health-giving deity", although its widespread attestation among ancient Celtic peoples may point to a Common Celtic origin of the cult. Scholar Miranda Aldhouse-Green writes that the deity probably pre-existed the Roman period. Philologist Marjeta Šašel Kos thinks that the worship of Belenus spread from Noricum towards the nearby towns of Aquileia and Iulium Carnicum (modern Zuglio).

Locations 
Tertullian, writing in c. 200 AD, identifies Belenus as the national god of Noricum. Inscriptions dedicated to Belenus are concentrated in the Eastern Alps and Gallia Cisalpina, but there is evidence that the popularity of the god became more widespread in the Roman period. 

Around 240, Herodian mentions Belenus' worship in Aquileia, where he was regarded as its patron god. During the siege of the city in 238 AD by emperor Maximinus Thrax, who died during the event while his army was defeated soon afterwards, Belenus was invoked as the divine protector of Aquileia. The soldiers reported seeing an appearance of the god floating in the air, battling and defending his town, in an evocation of Apollo's defence of Delphi against the troops of Brennos. Dedications to a Fons Beleni ('Fountain of Belenos') show connection with medicinal springs. The third-century emperors Diocletian and Maximian each dedicated an inscription to Belenus in the region of Aquileia. A further 6 votive inscriptions of Belenus were discovered at Altinum, Concordia and Iulium Carnicum.Belenus was an important god of Iulium Carnicum (modern Zuglio), a town close to the border with Noricum inhabited by the Carni. A sanctuary dedicated to the deity is attested by the second half of the 1st century BC, when its renovation was commemorated by two chiefs of the village. Epigraphic dedications to the god are also known in Venice and at Rimini. An altar was also found in Celeia (modern Celje), one of the most important Norican towns. The cult may have been introduced here from Aquileia, as suggested by the name of its dedicator, Lucius Sentius Forensis, the Sentii being well attested to at Aquileia, but not in Noricum.
Ausonius (later 4th century AD) alludes to sanctuaries dedicated to Belenus in Aquitania, and mentions a temple priest of the cult named Phoebicius. The deity was also popular in Provence, as attested by inscriptions from the Marseille and Nîmes areas. A votive inscription from Caesarean times by the poet Lucius Erax Bardus was found at Rochemolles, near Bardonecchia (Bardonnèche), in Italy (Alpi Graie). At Aquae Borvonis (Bourbon-Lancy), the Aedui worshipped Belenus in association with health giving waters.

Consort 
Images of Belenus sometimes show him to be accompanied by a female, perhaps the Gaulish deity Belisama. The river name Bienne (Biena in 1337 AD), present-day eastern France, and the place name Bienne (apud Belnam in 1142 AD), modern Switzerland, also attest to the existence of a feminine form *Belenā.

In Noricum, Belenus may also have been accompanied by an otherwise unknown female deity named Belestis (or Beléna, Beléstis Augústa, Beléstris, Belínca), possibly worshipped as a goddess of nature and fertility. Two shrines dedicated to the goddess were found in Podljubelj in the Karawanks.

Related beliefs

Medieval Ireland 
The Irish Bel has been speculated by some scholars to be linked to the god Belenus. Fires in honor of the deity were lit for Celtic festivals of Beltaine ('Bel's Fires') on May 1. On occasion, cattle was driven between two fires in order to repeal diseases, which Schrijver has compared to the traditional German custom of burning henbane collected on Midsummer to protect the cattle against diseases and witchcraft.

Modern Slovenia 
The Slovenian divinity Belin, attested in the 19th century by historian Simon Rutar, may provide evidence of the survival of Belenus' cult in the region and of its later integration into Slovenian beliefs, possibly blended with attributes of the Slavic god Belibog. The local population regarded him as a great healer who could cure blindness with his 'key'. Professor Monika Kropej also states that Belenus was possibly incorporated into the Slovenian lore as the beliči, a type of fairy-like beings. An incised stone in southwestern Slovenia, called berlina by the local population, among other names, may also be related. It is connected to ancient rituals and features two primitively carved figures with heads ornamented with rays.

Legacy

Science 
The minor planet 11284 Belenus is named after him.

Popular culture 
Belenus is often sworn, 'By Belenos', by the Gauls on the Asterix franchise.

References

Bibliography 

 

Gaulish gods
Gods of the ancient Britons
Celtic gods
Apollo
Health gods
Horse deities